Afonasovo is a rural locality (a village) in Karinskoye Rural Settlement, Alexandrovsky District, Vladimir Oblast, Russia. The population was 5 as of 2010. There are 4 streets.

Geography 
Afonasovo is located 19 km south of Alexandrov (the district's administrative centre) by road. Makhra is the nearest rural locality.

References 

Rural localities in Alexandrovsky District, Vladimir Oblast
Alexandrovsky Uyezd (Vladimir Governorate)